Shlomo (Polish: Szlomo, Szlama, Szlamek, Szloma), meaning "peaceable", is a common Hebrew male given name.

The name is used by Palestinians to refer to a person spying for Israel.

The following individuals are often referred to only by the name Shlomo:

 Solomon, king of ancient Israel, according to various religious texts
 Shlomo (beatboxing artist) or Simon Shlomo Kahn (born 1983)
 Shlohmo or Henry Laufer, an American electronic musician

The following individuals have the given name Shlomo:

 Shlomo Amar (born 1948), current Sephardi Chief Rabbi of Israel
 Shlomo Argov (1929–2003), Israeli diplomat whose attempted assassination led to the 1982 Lebanon War
 Shlomo Aronson (disambiguation), multiple people
 Shlomo Artzi (born 1949), Israeli singer and composer
 Shlomo Zalman Auerbach (1910–1995), Rosh Yeshiva of the Kol Torah yeshiva in Israel
 Shlomo Aviner (born 1943), Israeli Rosh Yeshiva of the Ateret Cohanim
 Shlomo Avineri (born 1933), Professor of Political Science, Hebrew University, Jerusalem
 Shlomo Bar (born 1943), Israeli musician and composer
 Shlomo Baum (1929–1999), Israeli military commando fighter
 Shlomo Ben-Ami (born 1943), Israeli diplomat, politician and historian
 Shlomo-Yisrael Ben-Meir (1910–1971), Israeli politician and member of the Knesset
 Shlomo Ben-Yosef (1913–1938), member of the Revisionist Zionist underground Irgun
 Shlomo Benizri (born 1961), former Israeli Labour and Welfare Minister
 Shlomo Bentin (1946–2012), professor of Psychology at the Hebrew University of Jerusalem
 Shlomo Bohbot (born 1942), Israeli politician and member of the Knesset
 Shlomo Breznitz (born 1936), Israeli author, psychologist, and president of the University of Haifa
 Shlomo Carlebach or Reb Shlomo (1925–1994), American Jewish rabbi, religious teacher, composer, and singe
 Shlomo Cohen (born 1941), Israeli diplomat
 Shlomo Cohen-Tzidon (1923–2012), Israeli politician and member of the Knesset
 Shlomo Cunin, American Hasidic rabbi
 Shlomo Dayan (born 1952), Israeli rabbi and former member of the Knesset
 Shlomo Dovrat, Israeli high-tech entrepreneur
 Shlomo Dykman (1917–1965), Polish-born Israeli translator and classical scholar
 Shlomo Eckstein (1929-2020), Israeli economist and President of Bar-Ilan University
 Shlomo Eitan, Hebrew language linguist
 Shlomo Eliahu (born 1936), Israeli businessman and former member of the Knesset
 Shlomo Elyashiv (1841–1926), Lithuanian Orthodox rabbi
 Shlomo Erell (born 1920), former Commander of the Israeli Navy
 Shlomo Freifeld (1925–1990), American Orthodox rabbi
 Shlomo Ganzfried (1804–1886), Hungarian Orthodox rabbi and author
 Shlomo Gazit (born 1926), Israeli former head of IDF military intelligence, President of Ben-Gurion University
 Shlomo Glickstein (born 1958), former Israeli tennis player
 Shlomo Goldman or Zvhil-Sanzer rebbe, American Hasidic rabbi
 Shlomo Goren (1917–1994), former Orthodox Ashkenazi Chief Rabbi of Israel
 Shlomo Grofman, Israeli real estate developer
 Shlomo Gronich (born 1949), Israeli composer, singer-songwriter, and choir conductor
 Shlomo-Ya'akov Gross (1908–2003), Israeli politician and member of the Knesset
 Shlomo HaKohen (Vilna) (1828–1905), Lithuanian Orthodox rabbi
 Shlomo HaKohen of Greece, 18th century mekubal and posek
 Shlomo HaKohen of Lissa, 18th century rabbi and biblical commentator
 Shlomo Halberstam (first Bobover rebbe) (1847–1905), first Bobover Rebbe
 Shlomo Halberstam (third Bobover rebbe) (1907–2000), third Bobover Rebbe
 Shlomo Hillel (born 1923), former Israeli Police and Interior Minister and Speaker of the Knesset
 Shlomo Jin, one of the first of the Kaifeng Jews to make aliyah; see Chinese in Israel
 Shlomo Kaplansky (1884-1950), Israeli politician and President of the Technion – Israel Institute of Technology
 Shlomo Lahat (1927–2014), eighth mayor of Tel Aviv
 Shlomo Lipetz (born 1979), Israeli baseball player
 Shlomo Ephraim Luntschitz (1550–1619), rabbi, poet and Torah commentator
 Shlomo Mintz (born 1957), highly regarded Israeli violin virtuoso
 Shlomo Moussaieff (rabbi) (1852–1922), one of the founders of the Bukharian Quarter in Jerusalem
 Shlomo Moussaieff (businessman) (born circa 1925), Israeli born millionaire businessman
 Shlomo Chanoch Rabinowicz (1882–1942), fourth Radomsker Rebbe in Poland
 Shlomo Riskin (born 1940), founder of the Lincoln Square Synagogue in New York City
 Shlomo Sand (born 1946), Israeli historian
 Shlomo Sawilowsky (born 1954), professor of educational statistics, Wayne State University
 Shlomo Scharf (born 1943), Israeli football manager
 Shlomo Sternberg (born 1936), leading American mathematician known for his work in geometry
 Shlomo Sztencl (1884–1919), Rav of Tzelodz and Sosnowiec, Poland
 Shlomo Veingrad, formerly Alan Veingrad (born 1963), American NFL football player
 Shlomo Wiesel, the father of Elie Wiesel, Holocaust survivor

The following individuals have the given name Szlomo:
 Szlomo Benjamin Fisz (1922–1989), Polish film producer and writer
 Szlomo Szmajzner (1927-1989), survivors of the Sobibór extermination camp
 Szlomo Zalman Lipszyc (1765-1839), Orthodox rabbi, and first Chief Rabbi of Warsaw

The following company is named Shlomo:

 Shlomo Group (founded 1974), an international holding group based in Israel

See also

 Hebrew name
 Š-L-M, the triconsonantal Semitic root
 Solomon (name)
 Shlomo, a South Park character appearing in the episode "Jewbilee".

References 

Hebrew masculine given names